The 1971–72 Divizia B was the 32nd season of the second tier of the Romanian football league system.

The format has been maintained to two series, each of them having 16 teams. At the end of the season the winners of the series promoted to Divizia A and the last two places from each series relegated to Divizia C.

Team changes

To Divizia B
Promoted from Divizia C
 Chimia Râmnicu Vâlcea
 Vulturii Textila Lugoj
 Metalul Plopeni
 Chimia Făgăraș

Relegated from Divizia A
 Progresul București
 CFR Timișoara

From Divizia B
Relegated to Divizia C
 Metrom Brașov
 UM Timișoara
 Flacăra Moreni
 Vagonul Arad

Promoted to Divizia A
 ASA Târgu Mureș
 Crișul Oradea

League tables

Serie I

Serie II

See also 
 1971–72 Divizia A
 1971–72 Divizia C
 1971–72 County Championship

References

Liga II seasons
Romania
2